Javier Otero (born 18 November 2002) is a Venezuelan professional footballer who plays as a goalkeeper for Orlando City B in MLS Next Pro via the Orlando City academy.

Orlando City 
Otero joined the USSDA academy of MLS side Orlando City in 2018. He made his debut for the club's reserve affiliate Orlando City B on 24 October 2020, starting in a 4–1 loss to Greenville Triumph in USL League One.

On 15 June 2022, Otero signed a short-term MLS contract to be rostered for Orlando City's game against New England Revolution in the absence of regular backup Mason Stajduhar. He was not named to the matchday squad behind Pedro Gallese and Adam Grinwis.

Personal life
Born in Venezuela, Otero also holds Spanish nationality.

References

External links
Orlando City profile
USSDA profile

2002 births
Living people
People from Cumaná
Venezuelan footballers
Spanish footballers
Venezuelan emigrants to Spain
Association football goalkeepers
Orlando City B players
USL League One players
MLS Next Pro players
Venezuelan expatriate footballers
Spanish expatriate footballers
Expatriate soccer players in the United States
Orlando City SC players